Izvika, Naglas (наглас) or Kajda (кајда) is a traditional polyphonic folk singing in southwestern Serbia, in the Zlatibor region (Užice), although similar styles are also found in Vlasotince and other parts of the country. It is sung in a duet. A folk dance, sakajdo, accompanies the singing.

See also
Ojkanje

References

Sources

External links

Serbian folk music
Polyphonic singing